Bacillus horikoshii is a facultative anaerobe bacterium. It is a gram positive, alkaliphilic and alkalitolerant, aerobic endospore-forming bacteria.

This species has been recently transferred into the genus Sutcliffiella. The correct nomenclature is Sutcliffiella horikoshii.

References

External links
UniProt entry
Type strain of Bacillus horikoshii at BacDive -  the Bacterial Diversity Metadatabase

horikoshii